is a Japanese politician from the Liberal Democratic Party currently serving as State Minister for Reconstruction.

References 

1955 births
Living people
21st-century Japanese politicians
Liberal Democratic Party (Japan) politicians
Government ministers of Japan

Members of the House of Representatives (Japan)